Korean cold noodles may refer to:

 Naengmyeon
Bibim-naengmyeon
Bibim-guksu